Shahin Taherkhani (born January 7, 1997, in Qazvin) is an Iranian professional footballer who plays as a centre-back for Persian Gulf Pro League club Nassaji Mazandaran.

Club career

Esteghlal
He made his debut for Esteghlal in first fixtures of 2019–20 Iran Pro League against  Machine Sazi.

Paykan
In November 2020, he moved to Paykan on deadline day. He made his debut for the club in the second week of the 2020–21 Persian Gulf Pro League against Shahr Khodro. They won that game 1-0, he played 46 minutes and got subbed off for Mohammad Amin Darvishi.

References

External links 
 Taherkhani on Instagram
 Taherkhani on Facebook

Living people
1997 births
Association football defenders
Iranian footballers
Gostaresh Foulad F.C. players
Esteghlal F.C. players
Paykan F.C. players
Nassaji Mazandaran players
Persian Gulf Pro League players
People from Qazvin